{{Infobox Christian leader
| type = Cardinal
| honorific-prefix = His Eminence
| name = Mario Aurelio Poli
| honorific-suffix = 
| native_name = 
| native_name_lang = 
| title = Cardinal, Archbishop of Buenos Aires
| image = Mario Aurelio Cardinal Poli (cropped).JPG
| image_size = 
| alt = 
| caption = 
| church = 
| province = 
| metropolis = Buenos Aires
| archdiocese = Buenos Aires
| see = Buenos Aires
| elected = 
| appointed = 28 March 2013
| term = 
| term_start = 20 April 2013
| quashed = 
| term_end = 
| predecessor = Jorge Mario Bergoglio (now Pope Francis)
| opposed = 
| successor = 
| other_post = 
| previous_post = 
| ordination = 25 November 1978
| ordained_by = Juan Carlos Aramburu
| consecration = 20 April 2002
| consecrated_by = Jorge Mario Bergoglio (now Pope Francis)
| cardinal = 22 February 2014
| created_cardinal_by = Pope Francis
| rank = Cardinal-Priest
| birth_name = 
| birth_date = 
| birth_place = Buenos Aires, Argentina
| death_date = 
| death_place = 
| buried = 
| nationality = Argentine
| religion = Roman Catholic
| residence = 
| parents = 
| spouse = 
| children = 
| occupation = 
| profession = 
| education = 
| alma_mater = 
| motto = "Concédeme, Señor, un corazón que escuche"
| signature = 
| signature_alt = 
| coat_of_arms = 
| coat_of_arms_alt = 
| other = 
}}

Mario Aurelio Poli (born 29 November 1947) is an Argentine prelate of the Catholic Church who has served as the Archbishop of Buenos Aires since April 2013. He previously served as the Bishop of Santa Rosa from 2008 to 2013. Pope Francis, his predecessor in Buenos Aires, made him a cardinal in 2014.

Early life, education, and presbyterate
Mario Poli was born in Buenos Aires in 1947 as a son of Italian immigrants. He began his philosophical and theological studies in 1969 at the Inmaculada Concepción Seminary in Villa Devoto. He obtained degrees as bachelor of social services at the University of Buenos Aires and as doctor of theology at the Pontifical Catholic University of Argentina. Poli was ordained a priest by Cardinal Juan Carlos Aramburu on 25 November 1978, and led the Parish of San Cayetano in Liniers for two years.

In 1992, the Archbishop of Buenos Aires Cardinal Antonio Quarracino appointed him Director of the Vocational Institute "Saint Joseph", place of formation of the future priests, where he exercised a peculiar and striking selective discrimination on the postulants or candidates to the entrance, for internal ideological, socio-economic reasons, for carrying face and geographical origin.

He obtained the title of doctor in Theology and was professor of ecclesiastical history and Patrology at the Argentine Catholic University.

Episcopal career

Pope John Paul II appointed him auxiliary bishop of Buenos Aires in 2002, and Pope Benedict XVI appointed him Bishop of Santa Rosa in 2008.

Poli has opposed same-sex marriage in Argentina and commented that he would have a respectful but distant relationship with the administration of Argentine President Cristina Fernández de Kirchner, a political stance similar to that of Bergoglio. He has requested an increased dialogue between the church and the state.

News of his appointment as Archbishop of Buenos Aires was leaked to the press on 27 March 2013, upon the ascension of his predecessor, Jorge Bergoglio to the papacy as Pope Francis, which was not well received by the church. Poli's appointment was officially announced on 28 March and he was enthroned on 20 April at the Buenos Aires Metropolitan Cathedral, He received the pallium from Pope Francis in Rome on 29 June 2013.

Cardinalate

Poli was created Cardinal-Priest in the consistory of 22 February 2014. and assigned the titular church of San Roberto Bellarmino, whose previous occupant was Bergoglio (now Pope Francis), also from the see of Buenos Aires.

On 19 February 2014 he was appointed a member of the Congregation for the Oriental Churches and Pontifical Council for the Laity.

Poli gave the homily for the Mass at the Buenos Aires Metropolitan Cathedral for the 2014 First National Government'' holiday. Poli quoted Francis and requested more political dialogue.

See also

Cardinals created by Francis

References

External links

 
Mario Poli

1947 births
Living people
Clergy from Buenos Aires
Argentine people of Italian descent
University of Buenos Aires alumni
Pontifical Catholic University of Argentina alumni
21st-century Roman Catholic archbishops in Argentina
Roman Catholic archbishops of Buenos Aires
Argentine theologians
Cardinals created by Pope Francis
Argentine cardinals
Members of the Congregation for the Oriental Churches
Members of the Pontifical Council for the Laity
Roman Catholic bishops of Santa Rosa in Argentina